Touat-Cheikh Sidi Mohamed Belkebir Airport  is a public airport located 6 nm (11 km) southeast of Adrar, the capital of the Adrar province (wilaya) in Algeria.

Facilities 

Airlines and destinations

Statistics

References

External links 
 Google Maps - Adrar
 Etablissement de Gestion de Services Aéroportuaires d’Alger (EGSA Alger)
 
 
 Airport record for Touat Cheikh Sidi Mohamed Belkebir Airport at Landings.com.

Airports in Algeria
Buildings and structures in Adrar Province